The Leigh Centurions (known as just Leigh until the completion of the 1994–95 Rugby Football League season) are an English rugby league club. Leigh began Rugby Football Union competition in 1878, and in 1895 became a founding member of the Rugby Football League (originally the Northern Rugby Football Union) that broke away from the Rugby Football Union. 

From that first 1895 season under rugby league rules, through to the end of competition in the 2018 RFL Championship season, Leigh has had 1,469 players, excluding non-playing substitutes, take the field during a competitive first-class match. This includes matches that were subsequently abandoned, expunged or re-played, but excludes friendlies.

These Leigh rugby league players have been allocated a sequential heritage number, in order of their appearance, by the Leigh Centurions.

List 
In the following table:
 The individual columns may not reflect the exact type of scoring, due to rule changes over the years, though "Total Points" is correct:
 The table does account for the points associated with kicking-related scoring (goals), during the first two seasons (1895–96, 1896–97) of Northern Rugby Football Union's existence, when conversions were worth 2-points, penalty goals 3-points and drop goals 4-points.
 From 1897–98 to 1972-73, all goals earned 2-points, so drop-goals were not always tracked separately from other goals for the purposes of "Drop Goals" column on this list.
 While the "Début" and "Last Match" dates are accurate, and reflect a player's first and last time with Leigh, a player may have played with another high-level rugby league team before, during or after the period of those two dates.
 Available (incomplete) information is shown indicating players selected to play on national, international (Other Nationalities, British Empire XIII) or regional teams.

Players earning international caps while at Leigh

 Trevor Allan won caps for Other Nationalities while at Leigh circa-1952 ?-caps won caps for British Empire XIII while at Leigh circa-1952 ?-caps
 Kevin Ashcroft won caps for Great Britain while at  Leigh 1968 Australia France, 1969 France, 1970 France, New Zealand, 1974 New Zealand (sub) (World Cup 1968 1-cap, 1970 2-caps)
 Benjamin John "Jackie" Bowen won caps for Wales while at Wigan, and Leigh 1945–48 2-caps
 Jeffrey "Jeff" Burke (#12) won caps for Other Nationalities while at Leigh circa-1951 ?-caps
 Joseph "Joe" Cartwright won caps for England while at Leigh 1921 Wales, Other Nationalities, Australia, 1922 Wales, 1923 Wales (2 matches), and won caps for Great Britain while at Leigh 1920 Australia, New Zealand (3 matches), 1921–22 Australia (3 matches)
 David Chisnall won caps for England while at Warrington 1975 Wales (sub), France, Wales, New Zealand, Papua New Guinea, and won caps for Great Britain while at Leigh 1970 Australia, New Zealand (World Cup 1970 1-cap)
 Thomas "Tom" Clarkson won caps for England while at Leigh 1921 Australia, 1922 Wales, 1923 Wales
 Thomas "Tom" Coop, won a cap for England (RU) while at Leigh in 1892 against Scotland
 Joseph "Joe" Darwell won caps for England while at Leigh in 1922 against Wales, and in 1923 against Wales (2 matches), and won caps for Great Britain while at Leigh in 1924 against Australia (3 matches), and New Zealand (2 matches)
 Malcolm Davies won caps for Wales while at Leigh, and Bradford Northern 1953–1959 2-caps
 Steve Donlan won caps for England while at Leigh 1984 Wales, and won caps for Great Britain while at Leigh 1984 New Zealand, Papua New Guinea
 Desmond "Des" Drummond won caps for England while at Leigh 1980 Wales, France, 1981 France, Wales, 1984 Wales, and won caps for Great Britain while at Leigh 1980 New Zealand (2 matches), 1981 France (2 matches), 1982 Australia (3 matches), 1983 France (2 matches), 1984 France, Australia (3 matches), New Zealand (3 matches), Papua New Guinea, 1985 New Zealand (3 matches), 1986 France (2 matches), while at Warrington 1987 Papua New Guinea, 1988 France
 Joe Egan won caps for England while at Wigan 1943 Wales, 1944 Wales, 1945 Wales (2 matches), 1946 France (2 matches), Wales (2 matches), 1947 France (2 matches), Wales (2 matches), 1948 France (2 matches), Wales, 1949 Wales, France, Other Nationalities, 1950 Wales, while at Leigh Wales, France, and won caps for Great Britain while at Wigan 1946 Australia (3 matches), 1947 New Zealand (3 matches), 1948 Australia (3 matches), 1950 Australia (3 matches), New Zealand (2 matches)
 Wyndham Emery won a cap for Wales while at Leigh 1922 1-cap
 Stuart Ferguson won a cap for Wales while at Leigh 1970 1-cap 2-goals 4-points
 Peter Foster won caps for Great Britain while at Leigh in 1955 against New Zealand (3 matches), and also represented Great Britain while at Leigh between 1952 and 1956 against France (1 non-Test match)
 Frederick "Fred" Harris won caps for England while at Leigh 1934 Australia, while at Leeds 1937 France
 Adam Hughes won caps for Wales while at Widnes Vikings, Leigh, and Oldham R.L.F.C. 2002–2007 13(11?)-caps 9-tries 3-goals 42-points
 Christopher "Chris" Johnson won a cap for Great Britain while at Leigh in 1985 against France
 Clive Jones won caps for Wales while at Leigh in the 1975 Rugby League World Cup against New Zealand, and France (World Cup 1975 2-caps)
 Edward "Ted" Kerwick won caps for England while at Leigh 1949 Other Nationalities
 Frank Kitchen won caps for Great Britain while at Leigh (World Cup 1954 2-caps, 3-tries)
 James "Jimmy" Ledgard won caps for England while at Dewsbury 1947 France (2 matches), Wales, while at Leigh 1948 Wales, 1949 France, Other Nationalities, 1951 Wales, France, 1952 Other Nationalities (2 matches), Wales, 1953 Wales, 1955 Other Nationalities, and won caps for Great Britain while at Dewsbury 1947 New Zealand (2 matches), while at Leigh 1948 Australia, 1950 Australia (2 matches), New Zealand, 1951 New Zealand, 1954 France (2 matches), Australia, New Zealand (World Cup 1954 4-caps, 1-try, 13-goals)
 Gordon Lewis won a cap for Wales while at Leigh in 1970 against England, and won a cap for Great Britain while at Leigh in 1965 against New Zealand
 Tauʻalupe Liku won caps for Tonga while at Leigh 1995 ?-caps
 Michael "Mick" Martyn won caps for Great Britain while at Leigh in 1958 against Australia, and in 1959 against Australia
 Walter Mooney won caps for Great Britain while at Leigh in 1924 against New Zealand (2 matches)
 Tony Heaton won 3 caps for Scotland, The first 2 were as a Student in the 1995 Emerging Nations World Cup and the 3rd while at Leigh in 1996 against Ireland
 Mark Moran won caps for Wales while at Leigh 1992 2-caps (sub)
 Christopher "Chris" Morley won caps for Wales while at St. Helens in 1996 against France (sub), and England, while at Salford City Reds in 1999 against Ireland, and Scotland, while at Sheffield Eagles in 2000 against South Africa (sub), while at Leigh in the 2000 Rugby League World Cup against Lebanon (sub), New Zealand, Papua New Guinea (sub), and Australia, while at Oldham R.L.F.C. in 2001 against England, while at Halifax in 2003 against Russia, and Australia, while at Swinton Lions in 2006 against Scotland, 1996–2006 13(14?)-caps + 4-caps (sub) 1(2?)-try 4(8?)-points
 Alex Murphy (Warrington) won caps for England while at Leigh 1969 Wales, France, and won caps for Great Britain while at St. Helens 1958 Australia (3 matches), New Zealand, 1959 France (2 matches), Australia, 1960 New Zealand, France, Australia, France, 1961 France, New Zealand (3 matches), 1962 France, Australia (3 matches), 1963 Australia (2 matches), 1964 France, 1965 France, New Zealand, 1966 France (2 matches), while at Warrington 1971 New Zealand (World Cup 1960 3-caps, 1-try)
 Stanley "Stan" Owen won a cap for Great Britain while at Leigh in 1958 against France, and represented Wales while at Leigh in 1955 against France, and in 1963 against France
 Charles "Charlie" Pawsey won caps for England while at Leigh 1951 Wales, 1952 Other Nationalities (2 matches), Wales, 1953 France (2 matches), Wales, Other Nationalities, and won caps for Great Britain while at Leigh 1952 Australia (3 matches), 1954 Australia (2 matches), New Zealand (2 matches)
 Gareth Price won caps for Wales while at St. Helens, Leigh, Rochdale Hornets, and Celtic Crusaders 1999–present 2(9, 10?)-caps + 9-caps (sub) 1-try 4-points
 Rob Roberts won caps for Wales while at Huddersfield Giants, unattached, Leigh, and Oldham R.L.F.C. 2002–present 6(7, 8?)-caps + 2-caps (sub) 2-tries 8-points
 William "Bill" Robinson won caps for Great Britain while at Leigh in 1963 against France, and Australia
 Dick Silcock won caps for England while at Leigh 1906 Other Nationalities, and won caps for Great Britain while at Wigan 1909 Australia
 Raymond "Ray" Tabern won caps for Great Britain while at Leigh in 1982 against France
 Joseph "Joe" Walsh won caps for Great Britain while at Leigh in 1971 against New Zealand
 Ian Watson won caps for Wales while at Salford City Reds, Swinton Lions, Widnes Vikings, Rochdale Hornets, Oldham R.L.F.C., and Leigh 1996–present 19(17?)-caps + 3-caps (sub) 3(4?)-tries 1-goal 14(18?)-points
 David "Dave" Whittle won caps for Wales while at Leigh 2000–2002 5(6?)-caps + 1-cap (sub)
 William "Billy" Winstanley won caps for England while at Leigh 1910 Wales, while at Wigan 1911 Wales, Australia, 1912 Wales, and won caps for Great Britain while at Leigh 1910 Australia, New Zealand, while at Wigan 1911–12 Australia (3 matches)
 John Wood won caps for Great Britain while at Leigh 1982 France
 John Woods won caps for England while at Leigh 1979 Wales (sub), France, 1980 Wales (sub), France, 1981 France, Wales, Wales (sub), and won caps for Great Britain while at Leigh 1979 Australia (3 matches), New Zealand, 1980 New Zealand, 1981 France (2 matches), 1982 Australia, Australia, 1983 France, while at Warrington 1987 Papua New Guinea
 Albert Worrall won caps for England while at Leigh 1934 Australia

Other notable players
These players have either; received a testimonial match, are "Hall of Fame" inductees, played during Leigh Centurions' Super League season, or were international representatives before, or after, their time at Leigh.

 Albert Ashton circa-1940 (Father of Brian Ashton)
 Ken Baxter
 Owen 'Ozzy' Bevan (brother of Brian Bevan)
 Mick Bolewski, the first player from the Australian state of Queensland to sign with a British club.
 Mathew Bottom circa-2005
 Edward "Ted" Brophy circa-1962
 Liam Coleman circa-2005
 Mick Collins  408-games 1970–71 Challenge Cup winner
 Benjamin "Ben" Cooper circa-2005
 Jason Duffy circa-2005
 John Duffy circa-2005
 Dominic Feau'nati circa-2005
 Jason Ferris circa-2005
 Dai Fitzgerald
 Darren Fleary circa-2005
 Carl Forber circa-2005
 Michael "Mike" Govin circa-2005
 Danny Halliwell circa-2005
 Kevin Henderson circa-2005
 Christopher "Chris" Hill circa-2005
 Michael "Mick" Hogan (#1)
 Rob Jackson circa-2005
 Chris Jones circa-2005
 Philip "Phil" Jones circa-2005
 Jason Kent circa-2005
 James King circa-2005
 Ian Knott circa-2005
 Mark Leafa circa-2005
 Steve McCurrie circa-2005
 Keiron Maddocks circa-2005
 Stephen "Steve" Maden circa-2005
 Richard Marshall circa-2005
 Robert Mears circa-2005
 Fui Fui Moi Moi
 Richard Moore circa-2005
 Rex Mossop 1952–55
 Nicholas "Nick" Owen circa-2005
 McDonald Bailey 1953
 Bev Risman circa-1963/64
 Paul Rowley circa-2005
 Rob Smyth circa-2005
 Michael "Mick" Stacey (Testimonial match 1982)
 Craig Stapleton circa-2005
 Warren Stevens circa-2005
 Matthew "Matt" Sturm circa-2005
 James "Jimmy" Taylor circa-2005
 Rod Tickle  114-Tries
 Neil Turley circa-2005
 Colin Tyrer circa-1965
 Oliver Wilkes circa-2005
 John Wilshere circa-2005

References

 
Leigh Centurions